Skinnyman (born Alexander Graham Holland, 9 November 1974) is a British rapper who was born in Chapeltown Leeds, Yorkshire and moved to Finsbury Park, London at a young age. He grew up on the Six Acres Estate next to Andover Estate. Among his friends was fellow Leeds-born, London-raised Cornwall DJ Pat Mckay.

He formed the Mud Family with Mongo and Chester P, a group which released a number of EPs. These included such records as "Itchy Town" and "Lash Suttin", a reworking of Redman's "Smash Something". Later Mr. Ti2bs, Uncle Festa and more joined the group. Skinnyman released a solo album, Council Estate of Mind in 2004.

He appeared in the first episode of Tower Block Dreams, a 2004 documentary series on BBC Three which looked into the underground music scene in council estates. He also played a small part in the 2005 interactive TV series Dubplate Drama.

2004: Council Estate of Mind 
Council Estate of Mind was released on Low Life Records in 2004, shortly before Skinnyman was again incarcerated. It spent two weeks in the official album chart, with a peak position of number 65. Skinnyman claimed in a 2019 interview with The Face to have "never been paid a penny to this day from Council Estate of Mind."

Notably many samples on the album are taken from the 1982 television play Made in Britain.

Discography

Studio albums

Singles and EPs
Fuck the Hook EP (2003, Low Life)
"No Big Ting / Council Estate of Mind" (2004, Low Life)
"I'll Be Surprised / Never Gonna Happen" (2004, Low Life)
"Creatures of the Night / My Life in Rhymes" (2004, PM Muzik)
 Skinnyman & DJ Flip – "Forever Rangers / Not Bonnie & Clyde (Instrumentals)" (2005, Netgroove)
 Ruben da Silva feat. Skinnyman & Manasseh - "Sensi Skank" (2011, RR008)
Music Speaks Louder Than Words EP (TBC, Mud Fam Music)

Guest appearances
The London Convention – The London Allstars (single), 1997
New Mic Order – Task Force, 1999
putt the word out – mystro & jargon, 1999 deal real records
U.S.S.R. Life from the Other Side – DJ Vadim, 1999
The Unknown – Mark B & Blade, 2000
Twilight Of The Gods – Skitz (single), 2000
Word Lab – Various Artists, 2000
Big Tings We Inna – Rodney P (single), 2001
Biro Funk – Braintax, 2001
Countryman – Skitz, 2001
The Legacy: Episode 1 – Various Artists, 2001
Bang Y2K – DJ Vadim (single), 2002
U.S.S.R. The Art Of Listening – DJ Vadim, 2002
Straight Outta Botley- WESTWOOD VOLUME 2, 2002
Asylum Speakers – Foreign Beggars, 2003
Civilians – Dark Circles, 2003
The World According to RZA – Various Artists, 2003
Basementality EP (Part 1) – Underground Alliance, 2004
Elementz Universe Vol. 1 – The Elementz (single), 2004
Have Patience – Karl Hinds, 2004
Lets Av It – Karl Hinds Feat. Skinnyman 2004
When I Give My Heart To You – DJ Mentat (single), 2004
Bar Fight – First Rate (single), 2005
Fame And Money – The Booty Bouncers (single), 2005
Skitz Homegrown Vol. 2 – Various Artists, 2005
Tip of Da Mysberg Volume 1 – Mystro, 2005
Up Your Speed (remix) – Sway, 2005
The Whole Nine - Sway, Life & SkinnyMan 2006
U Must Learn - Skinnyman, KRS-One, Paradise 2006
Change Your Heart – Nemesis & Arrogance Real Records, 2006
One Less Gun – Delta, The Lostralian LP 2006
Another Day – Angela Lawriw, 2006
Shakespeare (remix)  Akala
The Boy Who Cried Botley – Dap C Feat. Skinnyman & S.Kalibre NGU Records, 2006
Down – Lunar C feat. Skinnyman, 2017
Thriller - Fliptrix Feat. Skinnyman (Prod. Joe Corfield) High Focus Records, 2019
Jack - RATS feat. Skinnyman, When I Say Run Records, 2019
All In Together - Ricky Lix Feat. Cappadonna, Skinnyman & Harry Ixer (2021)
TrueMendous - Yourself or The World? Feat. Skinnyman (Prod. Illinformed) High Focus Records, 2022

References

External links
 Official website
 BBC Radio 1 Interview
Mud Family discography at the UK Hip Hop Database

English male rappers
Musicians from Leeds
1974 births
Living people
English rappers
English hip hop musicians